İbrahim Sarim Pasha (1801–1853) was an Ottoman statesman. He was Grand Vizier of the Ottoman Empire from 29 April 1848 until 12 August 1848.

References 

1801 births
1853 deaths
19th-century Grand Viziers of the Ottoman Empire
Ministers of Foreign Affairs of the Ottoman Empire